Ambazuces was a "Hunnic" ruler in the North Caucasus in the early 6th century, probably of the Sabirs.

According to the Byzantine historian Procopius, Ambazuces ruled the area of the "Caspian Gates"—most likely referring to the Darial Pass—during the reign of the Byzantine emperor Anastasius I. Procopius reports that he was friendly towards Byzantium, and in his old age offered to cede his realm, but Anastasius declined. This was probably during or shortly after the Anastasian War of 502–506 between Byzantium and Sassanid Persia.

After his death, he was succeeded by his sons, who were defeated by the Persian king Kavadh I, who annexed their territory to Persia.

References

Sources 
 
 

5th-century births
6th-century deaths
6th-century rulers in Europe
Hunnic rulers
North Caucasian Huns
Foreign relations of the Byzantine Empire